The men's qualification for football tournament at the 2003 All-Africa Games.

Qualification stage

Zone I (North Africa)
Morocco and Tunisia withdrew.

|}

Algeria qualified.

Zone II (West Africa 1)
First round

|}

Second round

|}

Senegal qualified.

Zone III (West Africa 2)
First round

|}

Second round

|}

Third round

|}

Ghana qualified.

Zone IV (Central Africa)
First round

|}

Second round

|}

Cameroon qualified.

Zone V (East Africa)
Tournament held in Egypt. Ethiopia, Sudan and Uganda withdrew after Egypt refused to honour their pledge to provide participating nations with return air tickets.

Egypt qualified.

Zone VI (Southern Africa)
First round

|}

Second round

|}

Third round

|}

South Africa & Zambia qualified.

Zone VII (Indian Ocean)
No matches, 2 teams qualify from Zone VI.

Qualifying teams
The following 8 nations qualified for men's play at the 2003 All Africa Games. Two teams qualify from Zone VI replacing Zone VII.

External links
African Games 2003 - Rec.Sport.Soccer Statistics Foundation

Qualification
2003